Wilbur Anthony McMullen, Jr. (born March 8, 1980) is a former American football wide receiver. He was drafted by the Philadelphia Eagles in the third round of the 2003 NFL draft. He played college football at Virginia.

McMullen has also been a member of the Minnesota Vikings, Washington Redskins, Seattle Seahawks, and Detroit Lions.

College career
As a senior at Virginia in 2002, McMullen became the second all-time leading receiver in ACC conference history with 210 career receptions.

Professional career

Philadelphia Eagles
McMullen was a third-round draft pick for the Philadelphia Eagles in the 2003 NFL draft.  He scored his first NFL touchdown against the Arizona Cardinals on December 24, 2005.

Minnesota Vikings
McMullen was traded to the Vikings on May 18, 2006 for Hank Baskett, an undrafted rookie receiver. The move reunited him with Brad Childress, who had been his offensive coordinator in Philadelphia before being hired as head coach of the Vikings. He spent one season in Minnesota, hauling in 23 catches for 307 yards and two touchdowns.

Seattle Seahawks
On January 2, 2008, McMullen signed a future contract with the Washington Redskins; he was released by the Redskins during final cuts on August 30.

McMullen was signed by the Seattle Seahawks on September 9, 2008. The team released wide receiver Jordan Kent to make room for McMullen on the roster. He appeared in four games for Seattle, including two starts, catching seven passes for 124 yards.

On October 18, 2008, McMullen was waived/injured after the Seahawks activated linebacker Will Herring from the PUP list.  He remained on injured reserve until he was released with an injury settlement on October 24.

On January 8, 2009, McMullen was re-signed to a future contract by the Seahawks. He was released on August 8 when the team signed first-round draft pick Aaron Curry.

McMullen was signed by the Detroit Lions on August 11, 2009, but he was waived on August 28 after the team claimed Glenn Holt off waivers.

External links
Seattle Seahawks bio

1980 births
Living people
Players of American football from Richmond, Virginia
American football wide receivers
Virginia Cavaliers football players
Philadelphia Eagles players
Minnesota Vikings players
Washington Redskins players
Seattle Seahawks players
Detroit Lions players
Henrico High School alumni